Kuala Lumpur Middle Ring Road 2 (MRR2 or Kuala Lumpur Middle Ring Road 2 Scheme), Federal Route 28, is a ring road built by the Malaysian Public Works Department (JKR) to connect neighborhoods near the boundary of Federal Territory of Kuala Lumpur and Selangor. However, the Kuala Lumpur Middle Ring Road 2 is generally referred to as Route 28 since Route 28 occupies about two-thirds of the system.

Route background
The zeroth kilometre of the Kuala Lumpur Middle Ring Road 2 is located at Sri Damansara Interchange. At the first kilometre, it is connected to the Federal Route 54, Damansara–Puchong Expressway and DUKE Extension Expressway (SDL). The Kepong Flyover diverts the MRR2 from the Federal Route 54.

At Gombak, the MRR2 overlaps again with the Federal Route 2 from Greenwood Interchange to Gombak North Interchange.

The Kuala Lumpur Middle Ring Road 2, Federal Route 28, ends at Sri Petaling Interchange, where it proceeds as the Shah Alam Expressway.

History

Construction of this ring road was divided into three phases. These phases were Bandar Sri Damansara–Kepong–Batu Caves–Gombak, Gombak–Ulu Klang–Ampang and Ampang–Pandan–Cheras–Sri Petaling. It was divided into 12 packages costing RM880 million. This project was built by the JKR and the Bumi Hiway Sdn Bhd as the main contractor.

Pioneer routes
The construction of the MRR2 included the acquisition and upgrades of several major roads as follows:

Developments

Upgrade to LED streetlights
The Kuala Lumpur Middle Ring Road 2 FT28 is one of the three federal highways being included under the pioneer LED street lights installation program on federal highways; the other two highways are the Subang Airport Highway FT15 and the Federal Highway FT2, covering the total distance of 63.1 km. The pioneer LED street lights installation program was a collaboration between the Ministry of Works and Ministry of Finance, as well as the Public Works Department as the implementing agency and Philips Malaysia as the contractor. The LED street lights replacement works began in June 2011 and was scheduled to be completed in March 2012.

According to the former Works Minister, Datuk Seri Shaziman Abu Mansor, the LED street lights could provide up to 50% savings on the electricity bills of those three federal highways. As of June 2011, the federal government paid RM26 million of the electricity bills for the conventional street lights nationwide every year. However, most streetlights on the road are broken and unlikely to be replaced.

Features
Half circular ring road
Six-lane dual carriageway
Many flyovers along ring roads including Kepong Flyover, Batu Caves Flyover, Melawati Flyover, Ampang Flyover, Pandan Flyover, Cheras Flyover and Bandar Tun Razak Flyover.
Kilometre and hectometre markers. It can be used for reporting accidents location. Some of them are not replaced when construction happens on the road.
Landmarks along MRR2 such as Batu Caves temple
The Kepong Metropolitan Park is located along MRR2 near Kepong.

Controversial issues

Squatter area at the MRR2 construction site
During the construction of the MRR2. The highway was constructed at the squatter area between Ampang, Pandan Jaya, Pandan Indah and Cheras in the 1990s.

Lemang stalls at MRR2
During the annual festival months and beyond, hawkers will set up 'lemang' stalls opposite Zoo Negara which causes dangerous traffic bottlenecks that can stretch 3 kilometers long during peak hours The Ampang Jaya Municipal Council (MPAJ) need to curb these safety hazards by relocating it elsewhere thus not affecting the traffic flow.

Beam cracks on the Kepong Flyover

First closure
Residents of the neighborhood of Kepong expressed their fear about the safety on the Kepong Flyover which was reported to be faulty as 31 of 33 pillars supporting the flyover were reported to have obvious cracks. At some pillars and tiers, there were more than 7000 cracks detected. Public concern about the safety issues at Kepong Flyover was due to the risks faced by at least 4,300 motorists using the flyover at a time. Investigations were carried out by four different parties, namely Maunsell, Sharma & Zakaria (the designer), Köhler & Seitz Engineering Services (appointed by the contractor), Halcrow Consultants Ltd. (appointed by JKR) and Leondhardt Andrä und Partner. Meanwhile, the Kepong Flyover was closed to traffic and then reopened with only 4 out of 6 lanes. On August 10, 2004, the Works Minister, Dato' Seri S Samy Vellu, reminded the public that the cracks were not due to design flaw and "nobody can simply open their mouth and suggest it is design flaw" (Bernama 10 August 2004). However, findings from Halcrow Consultants Ltd. suggested the design did not comply with the requirement of BS5400, the improper anchoring of the column rebar to the crossbeams and the formation of ettringite (delayed ettringite formation) were responsible for the cracks and were finally accepted by the ministry.

Second closure
On 4 February 2006, the Kepong Flyover was closed to traffic from 10:30 am after serious damages on the flyover were confirmed.

Many complaints arrived about the damages on MRR2. Traffic jams also have risen due to the incompletion of the MRR2 (see right).

On 8 December 2006, the Kepong Flyover was reopened to all traffic.

Third closure
On 3 August 2008, Kepong flyover was closed to all traffic after three of the eighteen carbon fibre panels on pillar 28 had peeled off. Pillar 28 is where the German consultant Leonhardt Andrä und Partner did the repair works as a sample for Malaysian contractor to follow. This is the third time the 1.7-km MRR2 Kepong flyover has been closed because of cracks.

List of interchanges

See also
Kuala Lumpur Inner Ring Road
Kuala Lumpur Middle Ring Road 1 
North-South Expressway Central Link 
Jalan Tuanku Abdul Halim

References

Ring roads in Malaysia
Malaysian Federal Roads
Highways in Malaysia
Expressways and highways in the Klang Valley